Spring Lake is an unincorporated community located in the town of Marion, Waushara County, Wisconsin, United States. It is located at the intersection of County Road F and N.

History
A post office called Spring Lake was established in 1852, and remained in operation until it was discontinued in 1923. The community took its name from nearby Spring Lake.

Notes

Unincorporated communities in Waushara County, Wisconsin
Unincorporated communities in Wisconsin